Johann von Wowern was a German statesman, philologist, and lawyer. He is known for his 1603 work De Polymathia tractatio: integri operis de studiis veterum,  the first work in Western Europe to use the term "polymath" in its title. Wowern defined polymathy as "knowledge of various matters, drawn from all kinds of studies ... ranging freely through all the fields of the disciplines, as far as the human mind, with unwearied industry, is able to pursue them". Von Wowern lists erudition, literature, philology, philomathy and polyhistory as synonyms.

References

1574 births
1612 deaths
17th-century German mathematicians
17th-century German lawyers
German philologists
17th-century German writers
17th-century German male writers
People from Hamburg